Guatteria ferruginea is a species of plant in the Annonaceae family. It is endemic to Suriname.

References

ferruginea
Endemic flora of Suriname
Data deficient plants
Vulnerable flora of South America
Taxonomy articles created by Polbot